Ninja is a beat 'em up game developed by Sculptured Software and released by Mastertronic in 1986 for the Atari 8-bit family, Commodore 64, and ZX Spectrum, then in 1987 for the Amstrad CPC, Amiga, Atari ST, and MS-DOS. An arcade version of the game was released in 1987 for Mastertronic's Arcadia Systems which is based on Amiga hardware. The Amiga, Atari ST, and Arcade versions were released as Ninja Mission. As a Ninja, the player attacks a fortress made of individual fixed screens which can be explored non-linearly.

Ninja was written by Steve Coleman, who previously created the Atari 8-bit games Rainbow Walker and The Pharaoh's Curse.

Gameplay 

The player controls a ninja who has to penetrate a Japanese fortress by fighting enemy ninjas with karate moves and by throwing shurikens and daggers. On his way, he has to collect all of the idols. The fortress is a series of horizontal, flip-screen segments that are stacked vertically. The player is not forced along a specific route, but can explore both sides of a branching path and also backtrack to earlier  screens.

Reception 
Ninja received mixed reviews. Bob Chappell writing for Atari User found the game very good with "first rate animation and sound. [...] For the low price, an unmissable bargain". Computer Gamer reviewer praised graphics, animation and sound of the game. On the other hand Zzap!64 reviewers found the Commodore 64 version awful and boring and gave it an overall rating of 25% concluding "One of Mastertronic's weakest releases."

Commodore User gave the game a rating of 4/10.

References

External links
Ninja at Atari Mania
Ninja Mission at Atari Mania
Ninja at Lemon64

1986 video games
Amiga games
Arcade video games
Amstrad CPC games
Atari 8-bit family games
Atari ST games
Commodore 64 games
DOS games
Mastertronic games
Beat 'em ups
Video games about ninja
Video games scored by David Whittaker
Video games scored by Rob Hubbard
Video games developed in the United States